Alatana (Bashkir and ) is a rural locality (a selo) and the administrative centre of Alataninsky Selsoviet, Sterlitamaksky District, Bashkortostan, Russia. The population was 137 as of 2010. There are 5 streets.

Geography 
Alatana is located 26 km northeast of Sterlitamak (the district's administrative centre) by road. Zabelskoye is the nearest rural locality.

References 

Rural localities in Sterlitamaksky District